Paul Brough (born 24 January 1965) is an English former professional footballer who played as a striker in the Football League for York City, and in non-League football for Knaresborough Town, York Railway Institute and Nestlé Rowntree.

References

1965 births
Living people
Footballers from York
English footballers
Association football forwards
Knaresborough Town A.F.C. players
York Railway Institute A.F.C. players
York City F.C. players
Nestlé Rowntree F.C. players
English Football League players